Oldham is an unincorporated community in Tishomingo County, Mississippi, United States.

References

Unincorporated communities in Tishomingo County, Mississippi
Unincorporated communities in Mississippi